Meggie is a given name. Notable people with the name include:

Meggie Albanesi (1899–1923), British actress
Meggie Dougherty Howard (born 1995), American soccer player
Meggie Meidlinger, American baseball player

See also
Maggie

Feminine given names